Manoj Bajpayee is an Indian actor who predominantly works in Hindi cinema He is the recipient of three National Film Awards, four Filmfare Awards, and two Asia Pacific Screen Awards. In 2019, he was awarded India's fourth-highest civilian honour, the Padma Shri, for his contributions to art.

Major associations

National Film Awards ⁣

Filmfare Awards ⁣

Asia Pacific Screen Awards⁣

Industry awards

IIFA Awards⁣

Filmfare OTT Awards⁣

Producers Guild Film Awards⁣

Screen Awards⁣

Zee Cine Awards⁣

Festival awards

Other awards

Footnotes

References 

Lists of awards received by Indian actor